Rose Meltzer is an American bridge player. After completion of 2014 tournaments she was the only woman among 84 living Open World Grand Masters and she ranked 58th among them by World Bridge Federation (WBF) open masterpoints.

For the 1999 to 2007 cycles of world bridge competition, Meltzer led professional teams that won two major open  world championships: the biennial Bermuda Bowl in 2001, representing the United States as USA2, and the quadrennial Rosenblum Cup in 2006. (Kyle Larsen was her partner in both tournaments.) In both 2005 and 2007 she was one of six players on USA senior teams that won the Senior Bowl, a tournament for older players that is contested alongside the Bermuda Bowl (open) and Venice Cup (women).

Bridge accomplishments

Awards

 Fishbein Trophy (1) 2000

Wins

 Bermuda Bowl (1) 2001
 North American Bridge Championships (6)
 Grand National Teams (1) 2003 
 Senior Knockout Teams (1) 2011 
 Keohane North American Swiss Teams (1) 2013 
 Mitchell Board-a-Match Teams (1) 2001 
 Chicago Mixed Board-a-Match (1) 2001 
 Spingold (1) 2000

Runners-up

 North American Bridge Championships
 Grand National Teams (2) 2000, 2001 
 Jacoby Open Swiss Teams (1) 2000 
 Chicago Mixed Board-a-Match (1) 2004 
 Spingold (3) 2003, 2009, 2010

References

External links
 
 

Living people
American contract bridge players
Bermuda Bowl players
Year of birth missing (living people)
Place of birth missing (living people)